Mere Paas Paas (also spelled Meray Paas Paas) is a Pakistani television series produced by Momina Duraid, written by Samira Fazal, and directed by Misbah Khalid. It stars Nadia Jamil, Moammar Rana and Deepak Parwani as leading characters of the series. It deals with themes such as single parenting, male-female friendship and the various social and emotional issues regarding the marriage of a houmg divorcee.

Plot
The story revolves around a happily married couple, Emaan and Adil. Their happiness remains still until Emaan gets pregnant. Adil displeases over it, considering it a hurdle in the way of his ambitions and tries to away from her. In her pregnancy period, Emaan who not only faces the physiological and mental changes  of being pregnant but also faces her husband's displeasure who gets involved in her colleague, Kiran. Facing these hardships, Emaan later gets befriend of Shariq, the next-door neighbour of her who later falls in hopeless love with her, as she is married.

Cast 
 Nadia Jamil as Emaan
 Deepak Perwani as Adil
 Moammar Rana as Shariq
 Faisal Shah
 Ayesha Khan
 Ayesha Sana
 Arisha Razi

Soundtrack
The original soundtrack of the series was sung by Atif Aslam and Hadiqa Kiani.

Production
It was the first independent production of Momina Duraid. According to her, it was meant to help her husband and mother-in-law. Nadia Jamil said in an interview said that the project is very close to her heart as the raw appeal of the character touched her as an actor.

Reception 
A reviewer from The Express Tribune noted its progressive storyline.

Awards and nominations

References

External links
 IMDb

Urdu-language television shows